Hans "Hasse" Karlsson (1 September 1932 – 1 June 2008) was a Swedish footballer who played as a defender. He made 119 Allsvenskan appearances for Djurgårdens IF and scored 29 goals. A former manager of IF Elfsborg, IFK Göteborg and the Sweden women's national football team, he died in June 2008.

Honours
Djurgårdens IF
 Allsvenskan: 1959, 1964

References

1932 births
2008 deaths
Association football defenders
Swedish footballers
Allsvenskan players
Djurgårdens IF Fotboll players
Swedish football managers
IF Elfsborg managers
IFK Göteborg managers
Sweden women's national football team managers